Eodorcadion oryx is a species of beetle in the family Cerambycidae. It was described by Jakovlev in 1895. It is known from Mongolia.

References

Dorcadiini
Beetles described in 1895